The House at 919 Oneida Street is a historic building located on the east side of Davenport, Iowa, United States. It has been listed on the National Register of Historic Places since 1984.

Architecture
This house shows the development of the Italianate form in Davenport from the Joseph Mallet House and the Joseph Motie House, both of which were built earlier. This particular house is a good example of the Vernacular-Italianate style that was popular in Davenport after the Civil War. It features projections from the box-like form, bracketed eaves, curved window hoods, and decorative elements cut by jig and scroll saws. The arched window surrounds, the front porch with the Corinthian order column caps, the bracketed cornice, and the unusual gable with decorative millwork apron and the bargeboards above the central oculus are all original to the house. Some of these elements are also found locally on Second Empire style houses. Its complex plan and roofscape, exemplified here by the full-height projecting window bays and gabled dormers toward the back of the structure, would be a feature of later Victorian architecture in Davenport.

Local Lore
The house was originally built at the bottom of the hill but was later moved to the top and its current placement per the owner's wishes. Such a move required the house to be literally split in two, then the halves were moved using an 'ice-block' method in which the house was set on giant blocks of ice and pulled by a horse. A perfect setting with a glorious view of the Mississippi River.

References

Houses completed in 1875
Victorian architecture in Iowa
Houses in Davenport, Iowa
Houses on the National Register of Historic Places in Iowa
National Register of Historic Places in Davenport, Iowa